Sewanhaka High School is a six-year public high school located in Floral Park, New York. It is part of the Sewanhaka Central High School District. Sewanhaka High School was established in 1929. Its name translates to "Island of Shells" in English.

As of the 2018–19 school year, the school had an enrollment of 1,669 students and 119.1 classroom teachers (on an FTE basis), for a student–teacher ratio of 14.0:1. There were 675 students (40.4% of enrollment) eligible for free lunch and 118 (7.1% of students) eligible for reduced-cost lunch.

History

Sewanhaka High School was constructed in 1929 by architects Knappe & Morris. Additional classrooms were completed in 1936. The school was established first in the district.

It is the only high school in its district to offer career vocational courses on Long Island. Those eligible to join this program include students from the other four high schools in the district.

Awards and recognition
During the 1992–93 school year, Sewanhaka High School was recognized with the Blue Ribbon School Award of Excellence by the United States Department of Education, the highest award an American school can receive.

Sports and clubs
The school's sports teams are known as The Indians and the team colors are purple, gold, and white.

There are many team sports, organized clubs, and student activities at Sewanhaka.

The Sports Team levels are Junior High (JH), Junior Varsity (JV) and Varsity (V) for boys and girls

Basketball
Baseball
Bowling
Badminton
Cheerleading
Cross Country
Football 
Field Hockey
Golf
Gymnastics
Lacrosse
Riflery
Soccer
Softball
Tennis
Track
Volleyball

Student government
Student Council
Class Board

Academic organizations
Arts and Crafts Club
Auto Club
Big Sisters & Big Brothers
Chess Club
Chieftain
FCCLA (Family, Career and Community Leaders of America)
French Club
Future Business Leaders of America (FBLA)
G.S.A. (Gay/Straight Alliance)
Italian Club
Junior Robotics
Mathletes, Junior High
Mathletes, Senior High
MIST NY
Mock Trial
National Art Honor Society
National English Honor Society
National Honor Society
National Junior Honor Society
National Math Honor Society
National Science Honor Society
Photography Club
Poets and Writers Club
Reading Club
Robotics Club
Seekers (Christian Club)
Sculpture Club
Sewanha-Con
Sewing Club
Skills USA (A District-wide Program)
Social Justice Club
Spanish Club
Students Participating in Community Events (SPICE)
Totem (Yearbook)
Tri-M Honor Society
Unity Club
Women in Science
Woodworking Club
World Cultures Club

Music and performing organizations
Cheerleaders, Junior High
Color Guard
Drama Club
Follies
Marching Band
Musical Performances
Rockettes
Stage Band
String Ensemble
Voices of Harmony

Service organizations
Builders Club
Cricut Makers Club
Key Club
P.A. Club (Sound & Lighting Club)
S.A.D.D. (Students Against Destructive Decisions)
Service Club
S.T.A.C (Students and Teachers Against Cancer)
Stage Crew
The Green Club

Model UN
The Model United Nations Debate Team at Sewanhaka starts with participation in the 1/2 credit World Issues class, and then upon completion, the students become members of the club.  The team goes on many conferences where they debate a wide variety of issues facing the real United Nations today. At the 2009 American University Model United Conference, the Sewanhaka team took home Overall Best Delegation, the prestigious first place award on the international scale. Two members of the team took home the distinguished delegation award in November 2011, continuing the team's success from the previous two years (members of the class of 2010).  Recently, Senator Jack M. Martins congratulated the Model UN team from Sewanhaka High School. The team participated in the Sewanhaka Interschool District Model UN competition.

More recently, in 2016, the team took home the trophy for Outstanding Small Delegation from the Rutgers University Model United Nations (RUMUN) conference.

The Chieftain
The school newspaper at Sewanhaka, The Chieftain, has been extant since the inception of the school. It has garnered many national and local awards, including the American Scholastic Press Award, Newsday High School Journalism Award, Hank Logerman Award, and an honorable mention in 2009 and 2010 during Adelphi Quill Young People's Press competition.

Its editorials argue both sides to a common problem that society currently faces and the rest of the paper updates the school on its recent activities, runs special features for special news events and covers the progress of its sports teams.

Theatre
Sewanhaka students perform in one musical per year, during the spring. Recent shows include: 
 The Addams Family (2020) 
 Hairspray (2019)
 Brigadoon (2018)
 The Phantom of the Opera (1986 musical) (2017)
 Beauty and The Beast (2016)
 Children of Eden (2015)
 In the Heights (2014)
 Legally Blonde (2013)
 Les Misérables (2012)
 Titanic (2011)
 All Shook Up (2010)
 Little Shop of Horrors (2009)
 Fame (2008)
 Bye Bye Birdie (2007)
 The Wiz (2006)
 Grease (2005)

Another play which is not a musical is performed each autumn by Sewanhaka students in the Drama Club. Recent shows include:
 Rumors (2015 and 2006)
 Done to Death (2014)
 Almost, Maine (2013)
 Up the Down Staircase (2012)
 The Clumsy Custard Horror Show and Ice Cream Clone Review (2011)
 Twelve Angry Jurors (2010)
 The Odd Couple female version (2009)
 Epic Proportions (2008)
 It Was A Dark And Stormy Night (2007)

Notable alumni
 Zendon Hamilton (born 1975), professional basketball player
 Alfred G. Hansen (born 1933), United States Air Force four-star general.
 Lloyd Harrison (born 1977), professional football player
 Evans Killeen (born 1936), professional baseball player
 Thomas Mallon (born 1951), book author and magazine contributor; member of the American Academy of Arts and Sciences
 Eamon McEneaney (1954-2001), lacrosse player, killed in the September 11 terror attacks
 Richie Moran (born 1937), lacrosse player and coach
 Al Oerter (1936–2007), Olympic discus throw 4-time gold medalist
 Sal Paolantonio (born 1956), Philadelphia-based bureau reporter for ESPN, who primarily reports on NFL stories.
 Pete Richert (born 1939), Major League Baseball pitcher 
 Telly Savalas (1922–1994), actor
 Vinny Testaverde (born 1963), college and professional quarterback, 1986 Heisman Trophy winner.
 Howard C. Vogts (1929–2010), the winningest high school football coach in New York State history
 Robert C. Wertz (1932-2009), politician who served for 32 years as a member of the New York State Assembly.

References

Public high schools in New York (state)
Floral Park, New York
Educational institutions established in 1929
Schools in Nassau County, New York
Public middle schools in New York (state)
1929 establishments in New York (state)